The SFI Group System is the most widely used classification system for the maritime and offshore industry worldwide. It is an international standard, which provides a functional subdivision of technical and financial ship or rig information.

SFI consists of a technical account structure covering all aspects of ship/rig specification, and it can be used as a basic standard for all systems in the shipping/offshore industry.

More than 6000 SFI systems have been installed worldwide.

SFI is used by shipping and offshore companies, shipyards, consultancies, software suppliers, authorities and classification societies.

Background, Purpose, and Advantages

Background 
The SFI Group System was first released in 1972 as the result of a research project undertaken by the Ship Research Institute of Norway (SFI: Skipsteknisk Forskningsinstitutt). Today, sales, marketing and upgrading of the SFI Group System is undertaken by SpecTec.

Purpose and Advantages 
The main purpose of the SFI Group System is to help shipping and offshore companies control operations by tying together all their procedures such as purchasing, accounting, maintenance, technical records, etc.
The SFI Group System provides major advantages for shipping and offshore operations in the following areas:
 Communication
 Computerisation
 Cooperation
 Cost Control
 Cost Comparison
 Development
 Education and Training
 Quality Control
 Standardisation

Scope 
When the SFI Group System was established, the intention was that it should be capable of accommodating all relevant ship or rig types, and it should be a common code for the flow of information between different enterprises within the maritime and offshore industry.

The system should be independent of company organization and methods of ship building, ship operation, maintenance and repair. It should further lend itself to be updated with regard to new ship types and new technology. In order to meet the purpose of and the requirements to the system, the ships were divided into functions. The ship functions are common to all parties who are concerned with the specification, building and operation of ships.

In addition to the Group System with Detail Code, it may be necessary for each user to develop special codes, such as plan of finance accounts for budgeting and cost control of total company operation.

Shipyards using the SFI Group System for planning and control of production will require a supplementary company internal Work Breakdown Structure (WBS).
Shipping companies using the SFI Group System for operation and maintenance planning and control, will require a coding system for consumables.

The Problems SFI Can Solve

Controlling Shipping and Offshore Operations 
The SFI Group System improves the control and quality assurance of activities such as maintenance, purchasing, accounting and record keeping within shipping and offshore operations.

SFI provides shipping and offshore companies, shipyards, authorities, suppliers and consultants with a common plan of technical account/codes in the handling of:
 Specifications
 Estimates
 Drawings
 Purchase
 Material Administration
 Maintenance and Repair Planning
 Instruction Material
 Budgets and Cost Control
 Files
The areas of system utilization are steadily increasing, and the system has contributed to increased efficiency in the maritime industry. The SFI Group Systemis a particularly useful tool when routines are being established according to the quality loop (ref. ISO 9004, par. 5.1).

Specifications 
Specifications are normally established at different levels of detail: Outline, Contract, Building, As Built and Repair Specifications. Technical descriptions of components should be part of the As Built Specification and should follow the SFI Detail Code.

The database version of the Group System lends itself especially well to the development of the various specifications. A report generator makes it easy for the user to edit specifications according to requirements.
Specifications may be related to different Group System levels.
 Outline specifications to Primary Group level
 Functional requirements to Secondary Group level
 Functional solutions to Tertiary Group level
 Component selections to Detail Code level

Estimates 
As estimates are based on specifications, they should follow the same breakdown structure. The estimates normally contain cost of material and working hours:

Drawings and Document Handling 
Drawings can easily be numbered according to SFI, and complex drawings in CAD systems may be split into layers to show individual installations according to the SFI Group System.

Drawing identification may incorporate a SFI Group System number. A standard drawing number may be composed as follows:

179-731-001
Ship no. – SFI tertiary group no. – Consecutive no.

Drawings should be numbered according to the group level if possible. The Primary and Secondary Group levels are usually used for system and arrangement drawings:

 179-100-000: General arrangement
 179-200-001: Profile and deck plan
 179-350-000: Loading and discharging system
 179-446-001: Engine stores arrangement

Item lists on arrangement drawings may also be coded according to the SFI Group System.

Purchasing 
A purchase is normally charged to a finance account (cost type) and to a SFI Group System number, often called a technical account (cost center).

When purchasing components, a yard may specify the individual item by the SFI Detail Code (6 digits). When a shipping company orders spare parts, these may be identified by the SFI Detail Code + consecutive numbers (total of 9-10 digits).

Material Administration 
When components are purchased directly to order/ship, the SFI Detail Code may be used as a technical account.

The spare part manufacturer may have its own numbering system. For a shipping company it is often convenient to establish a spare part numbering system comprising the SFI Detail Code + consecutive numbers:
 731.001 - Starting air compressor
 731.001.001 - HP cylinder
 731.001.002 - LP cylinder
 731.001.003 - HP cylinder cover
 731.001.004 - LP cylinder cover

Maintenance 
An operation and maintenance system will often contain a register covering all maintenance units on board. These units are normally identical to the components in the Detail Code:

731.001.01 - Starting air compressor no. 1
Maker:
Type:
Serial no.:
Capacity:

Procedures for preventive maintenance and class survey of a maintenance unit will be entered with job identification:

731.001.01 - Starting air compressor no. 1
Job A - 3000 hours routine
Job B - Class survey

All records of preventive and corrective maintenance should be filed and related to the maintenance unit. The technical accounts of planned maintenance systems such as AMOS Maintenance and Procurement are commonly based on the SFI Group System.

Repair 
Repair specifications are often based on information from the maintenance system. The repair bill should follow the repair specification structure. It is customary for the yard to quote prices to the shipping company at subgroup level.

Operation Budget 
The SFI Group System is used for budgeting of maintenance and repair work, and for spare part consumption. In order to make a complete operation budget in a shipping company, it is necessary to link the Group System to a plan of finance accounts. Any suitable plan of finance accounts may be used together with SFI.

The plan of finance accounts usually covers spare parts and consumable items. Budgeting of spare parts may be performed in great detail using the SFI Group System.

Cost Control 
Cost control of new building or repair work is normally carried out at the tertiary Group and Detail Code levels. Direct purchases are charged to the SFI Detail Code:

Materials:

Reporting of working hours is normally carried out at the tertiary group level. Activities and jobs must be established to follow up work progress.

Materials:

Quality Assurance 
In relation to ISO 9000 and IMO requirements for safe operation, it is necessary to establish procedures that ensure that specification requirements and rules and regulations from authorities and classification societies are met, and that the ship/rig is operated safely.

The following procedures and instructions should be classified according to SFI:
 Surveyor’s manual
 Installation description

Filing 
The SFI Group System is often used as a standard filing system for the shipping and offshore industry. SFI gives this industry a well structured and organized filing system for drawings, manuals, reports, and publications.
 Testing and commissioning procedures
 Operating, start and stop manuals
 Maintenance instructions
 Faultfinding
 Spare parts
 Tools
 List of drawings
 Certificates
 Agents

The Coding Structure of SFI

SFI Group System (3-digit) 

The SFI Group System is built up as a 3-digit decimal classification system. The ship/rig is divided into 10 Primary Groups from 0 to 9. Only Primary Groups 1 to 8 are in use. The users may use Primary Groups 0 and 9 for classifying other main components that are not covered by the SFI standard.

Each of the Primary Groups (1st digit) consists of 10 Groups (2nd digit) and each Group is divided further into 10 subgroups (3rd digit).
The Primary Groups (1st digit) of SFI for Ships is described below.

Primary Group 1 - General 
Details and costs that cannot be charged to any specific function on board, e.g. general arrangement, quality assurance, launching, dry-docking and guarantee 
work.

Primary Group 2 - Hull Systems 
Hull, superstructure and material protection of the vessel.

Primary Group 3 - Cargo Equipment 
Cargo equipment and machinery including systems for vessel’s cargo, loading/discharging systems, cargo winches and hatches.

Primary Group 4 - Ship Equipment 
Ship specific equipment- and machinery. Navigational equipment, manoeuvring machinery, anchoring equipment, and communication equipment. This group also includes special equipment such as equipment for fishing.

Primary Group 5 - Crew and Passenger Equipment 
Equipment, machinery, systems etc. serving crew and passengers, for example lifesaving equipment, furniture, catering equipment and sanitary systems.

Primary Group 6 - Machinery Main Components 
Primary components in the engine room, for example main601.000 and auxiliary651.000 engines, propellers, plant, boilers, and generators.

Primary Group 7 - Systems for Machinery Main Components 
Systems serving main machinery components, for example fuel and lubrication oil systems, starting air system, exhaust systems and automation systems.

Primary Group 8 - Common Systems 
Central ship systems, for example ballast and bilge systems, fire fighting and wash down systems, electrical distribution systems etc.

SFI Detail and Material Codes (6 digit) 
The detail and material codes cover components and materials that may be related to the individual subgroups. In order to reach the component level, it might be necessary to break the subgroups further down by using a detail code. This code has not yet been possible to standardize due to the variety of equipment and numbers onboard different types of ships, and due to slightly different requirements to the code for shipyards and shipping companies.

Usually there are two different classes of components and material that are used; one class comprises components and material that are ordered directly to a ship, the other comprises components and material that are ordered to stock. Consequently, the codes are divided into two parts:

Detail Code: Components that are purchased directly to order/ship. The detail code is used to define the individual component and equipment that acts in the sub system function. In the Detail Code the supplementary codes are built up from 001-099.

Material Code: This code relates to material that is purchased to stock.
The relations between these codes are as follows:
 SFI Group System + Detail Code: 731.000 – 731.099
 SFI Group System + Material Code: 731.100 – 731.999

User Rights for the SFI Group System

SFI User License 
An SFI User License Certificate must be purchased from SpecTec to use the SFI Group System. One license fee will be charged for each SFI installation. This means that one license is required for each ship/site/rig that uses the coding structure of SFI. There are additional charges for each book, file or database.

Formats of the SFI Group System

SFI Manuals 
The SFI manuals are available in the following formats:
 A4
 A5
 A6
 Letter
The A4, A5, and Letter manuals contain the following parts:
 SFI Code Matrix
 Summary lists of primary, secondary, and tertiary groups
 Detailed descriptions of secondary and tertiary groups
 Detail Codes
 Material Codes
 Keyword register
The A6 pocket manual contains:
 SFI Code Matrix
 Summary of primary, secondary, and tertiary groups
 Keyword register

Conclusion 
A classification system such as the SFI Group System will make a substantial contribution to standardized and well-ordered information related to ships/rigs, and will lead to improved communication both within a company and with external parties.

The SFI Group System will make shipping and offshore operations more efficient because companies will save resources and avoid pitfalls when implementing the SFI standards. SFI can be the common denominator tying together all functions of shipping and offshore operations such as maintenance, purchasing, accounting, filing etc.

External links 
The following websites may also be helpful:
 SpecTec's SFI Codification System
 IMO, the International Maritime Organization
 ISO, the International Organization for Standardization
 SFI page on the SpecTec website

Trade and industrial classification systems
Maritime transport
Drilling rigs